The 2018–19 Southern Utah Thunderbirds women's basketball team represented Southern Utah University during the 2018–19 NCAA Division I women's basketball season. The Thunderbirds are led by first-year head coach Tracy Sanders and play their home games at America First Events Center. They are members of the Big Sky Conference.

Roster

Schedule and results

|-
!colspan=9 style=| Non-conference regular season

|-
!colspan=9 style=| Big Sky regular season

|-
!colspan=9 style=| Big Sky Women's Tournament

See also
 2018–19 Southern Utah Thunderbirds men's basketball team

References

2018-19 team
Southern Utah
2019 in sports in Utah
2018 in sports in Utah